Socialista was a daily newspaper in Czechoslovakia, published between 1923 and 1925 in Prague. Commonly but not to be confused with El Socialista. Socialista was founded on 1 May 1923. It was the main organ of the Socialist Association.

References

1923 establishments in Czechoslovakia
1925 disestablishments in Czechoslovakia
Czech-language newspapers
Defunct newspapers published in Czechoslovakia
Newspapers published in Prague
Newspapers established in 1923
Publications disestablished in 1925